Faruk Bistric(born January 1, 1958, Sarajevo, Bosnia and Herzegovina) Chess champion of Bosnia & Herzegovina.He was International Master in 1997 and Chess Grandmaster in 2003. He was participated in 1998 and 2002 chess Olympiads.

Notable Tournaments

References 

1958 births
Chess grandmasters
Living people
Chess Olympiad competitors
Bosnia and Herzegovina chess players
Sportspeople from Sarajevo